Rio Bank is a locally owned and managed bank headquartered in McAllen, Texas with 14 Texas locations across the Rio Grande Valley.

History
In February 1985, Rio Bank opened its doors as a retail oriented bank primarily catering to consumers for both deposit and loan business.

In 1995, the bank opened its second banking center in North McAllen, Texas.

In 2002, the bank opened two new banking centers one in San Juan, Texas and the other in Palmview, Texas.

In 2005, the bank opened a new banking center in Brownsville, Texas and in 2009 opened a new banking center in Weslaco, Texas.

In 2018, Rio Bank acquired Elsa State Bank & Trust.  The merger increased Rio Bank's current $350 million in assets by an additional $200 million. The merger added locations that Rio Bank previously did not service, such as Starr County, Texas and Cameron County, Texas.

In 2019, the bank is expected to complete their new corporate headquarters building and move their operations by the end of the year.

References

Banks based in Texas
Companies based in McAllen